The A61 is a major trunk road in England connecting Derby and Thirsk in North Yorkshire by way of Alfreton, Clay Cross, Chesterfield, Sheffield, Barnsley, Wakefield, Leeds, Harrogate and Ripon. The road is closely paralleled by the M1 motorway between Derby and Leeds.

Route

Heading south, the road begins as single carriageway from Thirsk which bypasses Ripon and travels towards Harrogate, eventually passing through Harrogate town centre. Here, the road divides into two major one-way streets which enclose the town centre and run along The Stray, a  stretch of grassland in Harrogate. As Leeds Road, it then passes through the southern suburbs of Harrogate before meeting the A658 near the village of Pannal. The A61 continues through Harewood before approaching the north's metropolis, where a sudden urban fringe approaches. As the road enters Leeds and crosses the A6120 outer ring road, the road becomes Scott Hall Road, a main dual carriageway (or Trunk Road) and artery for north Leeds. There are sections of guided bus route using kerb guidance near Potternewton. Here, the A61 rises slightly, and a panoramic view of Leeds skyline is revealed. The descent into Leeds is quick and the road soon turns into a multi-lane road, as it approaches Sheepscar Interchange. Fast-flowing traffic is directed onto the A61, although some traffic is directed off the A61 to avoid Leeds City Centre as it routes around the back of Quarry House. The A61 meets it shortly after, as it shares the city centre loop for a short distance. After crossing the river, the road splits again before taking traffic out to the motorways. The road then continues out of Leeds towards Wakefield and Barnsley. South of Barnsley it crosses the M1 at Junction 36 then heads towards Sheffield. Between the M1 at Junction 36 and the Westwood roundabout intersection with the A616, the road is designated as a trunk road under the responsibility of Highways England.

The A61 travels into Sheffield through Grenoside and Hillsborough, passing next to the Sheffield Wednesday football stadium as Penistone Road. It continues down to Shalesmoor and at this point it forms a major artery into the City Centre from the north, becoming the Sheffield Inner Ring Road (which is labelled as A61 all the way around). It meets the A57 twice; at Park Square and Brookhill roundabout. At Junction 4 (Bramall Lane) of the Sheffield Inner Ring Road, is a spur road the A621 – Bramall Lane, this road takes you past the western side of Sheffield United's stadium and back onto the A61 as Queens Road. The A621 is used as a shortcut, instead of continuing on the Sheffield Inner Ring Road to Junction 3 (Granville Square), where it meets Queens Road further north. The A61 then continues through Heeley as Chesterfield Road and climbs up to Norton and onto Bowshaw roundabout. Between Sheffield and Chesterfield it is a dual carriageway, avoids Dronfield and Unstone as the eponymous by-pass. The road used to go through Chesterfield town centre, passing by the famous crooked spire, but was heavily congested. This was alleviated by the construction of the Chesterfield bypass in the 1980s on the alignment of the former Great Central Railway. The road reverts to single carriageway south of Chesterfield, passing through Clay Cross and Alfreton.

South of Alfreton, the A61 merges with the dual carriageway A38, but the old A61 continues as the B6179 through Swanwick and Denby, meeting the A38 again just north of the city. The A61 road continues towards the city centre along Sir Frank Whittle Road until it finally ends at the junction with the A52 near to the headquarters of Derbyshire County Cricket Club.

Road safety
In June 2008 a  stretch of the A61 between Barnsley and Wakefield was named as the most dangerous road in Britain, when motorcycle accidents were excluded. In the latest EuroRAP findings from the Road Safety Foundation, this stretch of road was also found to be the most dangerous road in Yorkshire and Humber. With 22 fatal and serious injury accidents in the three years analysed (2004–2006), this single carriageway route was rated as Red – the second highest risk category.

References

External links 

 UK roads: A61
 EuroRAP GB Tracking Survey Results
 Road Safety Foundation

Roads in England
Roads in Yorkshire
Transport in Derby
Roads in Derbyshire
Transport in Nottinghamshire
Transport in North Yorkshire
Transport in South Yorkshire
Roads in Sheffield
Transport in West Yorkshire
Transport in the City of Wakefield
Transport in Leeds
Borough of Harrogate
Roads with a reversible lane